Winona is an unincorporated community in Fayette County, West Virginia, United States. Winona has a post office with ZIP code 25942. The community has the name of Winona Gwinn, the daughter of a settler.

African-American historian Carter G. Woodson taught at a school in Winona founded by black miners for their children from 1898–1900.

References

Unincorporated communities in Fayette County, West Virginia
Unincorporated communities in West Virginia
Coal towns in West Virginia